Return of the Champions is a double live album by English rock band Queen + Paul Rodgers. It was recorded in May 2005 during the Queen + Paul Rodgers Tour at the Hallam FM Arena in Sheffield, England (except for "Imagine", which was performed in Hyde Park, London immediately after that year's terrorist attack) and released on 19 September 2005. A companion DVD was released in October, directed by David Mallet.

Track listing
All lead vocals performed by Paul Rodgers, except where noted.

Disc 1

Disc 2

NOTES: Tracks 12-13 are bonus songs from the DVD''

Personnel 
Paul Rodgers – lead vocals, guitars
Brian May – guitars, arrangements, vocals
Roger Taylor – drums, percussion, vocals
Spike Edney – keyboards, percussion, vocals
Jamie Moses – guitars, vocals
Danny Miranda – bass guitar, acoustic guitar, vocals
Freddie Mercury – pre-recorded vocals ("Bohemian Rhapsody", "Beautiful Day"), pre-recorded piano ("Bohemian Rhapsody")

Charts

Album

DVD

Certifications

References

External links 
 Queen official website: Discography: Return Of The Champions: includes lyrics of "Reaching Out", "Wishing Well", "Another Ones Bites The Dust", "Can't Get Enough".
 

Queen + Paul Rodgers albums
2005 live albums
2005 video albums
Live video albums
Hollywood Records video albums
Hollywood Records live albums
Parlophone live albums
Parlophone video albums
Films directed by David Mallet (director)